James "Red" Woodhead (July 9, 1851 – September 7, 1881) was an American professional baseball player. He played one game for the 1873 Baltimore Marylands of the National Association, three seasons for the Manchesters of the International Association from 1877 to 1879, and one partial season for the Syracuse Stars of the National League in 1879. Woodhead died at the age of 30 in Boston, Massachusetts and is interred at the historic Bennington Street Burying Ground in East Boston.

References

External links

Major League Baseball third basemen
Baltimore Marylands players
Syracuse Stars (NL) players
Manchester (minor league baseball) players
Baseball players from Connecticut
19th-century baseball players
Sportspeople from Chelsea, Massachusetts
1851 births
1881 deaths
Burials in Massachusetts
19th-century deaths from tuberculosis
Tuberculosis deaths in Massachusetts